Franco Brarda (born 23 August 1993) is an Argentine rugby union player who plays for the national Argentina team The Pumas.

References

External links
 UAR Profile
 itsrugby Profile

Jaguares (Super Rugby) players
Rugby union props
Argentine rugby union players
1993 births
Living people
Tala Rugby Club players